The Museum of the Moving Image is a media museum located in a former building of the historic Astoria Studios (now Kaufman Astoria Studios), in the Astoria neighborhood in Queens, New York City. The museum originally opened in 1988 as the American Museum of the Moving Image, and in 1996, opened its permanent exhibition, "Behind the Screen," designed by Ali Höcek of AC Höcek Architecture LLC. The museum began a $67 million expansion in March 2008 and reopened in January 2011. The expansion was designed by architect Thomas Leeser.

Description

The Museum of the Moving Image is focused on art, history, technique and technology of film, television, and digital media. It collects, preserves, and provides access to moving-image related artifacts via multimedia exhibitions and educational programming. The exhibits include significant audio/visual components designed to promote an understanding of the history of the industry and an understanding of how it has evolved. Panel discussions about current movies are frequently held at the museum. The museum hosts regular monthly series in its two premium theaters. These ongoing series include “Changing the Picture,” “Fist & Sword,” “New Adventures in Nonfiction,” “Science on Screen,” and “Disreputable Cinema.” Each of these explore and celebrate many aspects of the art and culture of cinema. It is also home to one of the most significant collections of video games and gaming hardware. The museum's attendance has grown from 60,000 in 2000 to an expected figure of 120,000 in 2011. In 2017, the museum opened “the Jim Henson Exhibition,” a permanent exhibit honoring the life and ingenuity of Jim Henson and his creations. Further, an exhibit entitled, "Envisioning 2001: Stanley Kubrick's Space Odyssey", opened in January 2020.

History

In 1970, the Astoria Motion Picture and Television Center Foundation took control of the former Astoria Studios in an effort to preserve the now-landmarked building, which was home to a number of significant productions. The foundation's work revitalized the site and consumers' interest in the industry, and plans were made to expand the consumer access to the studio in the form of a museum.

Following seven years of work, and at a cost of $15 million, the American Museum of the Moving Image opened on September 10, 1988, in the former East Coast home of Paramount Pictures as the first museum in the United States that was devoted solely to the art, history and technology of film, television and video. This was followed, days later, by the opening of the British museum of the same name. The New York theater, ultramodern by 1988 standards, was equipped to present 70mm, 35mm, and 16mm film formats and was one of only two sites in New York with the ability to present old nitrate prints. It also re-created moments from television and video history and allowed visitors the opportunity to watch television in a TV lounge from the early days of television.

In 2005, the museum was among 406 New York City arts and social service institutions to receive part of a $20 million grant from the Carnegie Corporation, which was made possible through a donation by New York City mayor Michael Bloomberg.

In March 2008, the museum broke ground for a $65 million expansion that doubled the museum's size and added a new theater and educational space. While the museum remained open during most of the construction period, with its old theater demolished and the new ones yet to be built, screenings series and other events were held off site, although the collection was still available to scholars. The museum opened its redesigned and expanded building, designed by Leeser Architecture, on January 15, 2011. The museum's permanent exhibition, "Behind the Screen," was also redesigned by AC Höcek Architecture LLC at this time.

Beginning in 2011, the museum began hosting the First Look Film Festival, which has since gained acclaim for hosting innovative new international cinema and introducing New York audiences to formally inventive works that seek to redefine the art form of cinema while engaging in a wide range of subjects and styles. The festival is programed by the museum's curator of film, Eric Hynes.

References

External links

 

1988 establishments in New York City
Astoria, Queens
Cinema museums in the United States
Cinema of New York City
Mass media museums in New York (state)
Museums established in 1988
Museums in Queens, New York
Telecommunications museums in the United States
Television preservation